The San Pedro College of Business Administration or SPCBA is a private, nonsectarian, tertiary institute located at Km. 30 Old National Highway, Barangay Nueva, San Pedro, Laguna, Philippines.

Undergraduate degree programs
 Accountancy
 Business Administration (majors in Marketing Management and Human Resources Development Management)
 Computer Science
 Information Technology
 Psychology
 Elementary Education (majors in English, Science and Mathematics)
 Secondary Education (majors in English, Science and Mathematics)
 Hotel and Restaurant Management
 Tourism
 Industrial Engineering
 Computer Engineering
 Mechanical Engineering
 Human Resource Development

Graduate degree programs
 Master of Business Administration
 Master of Government Management

References

External links
 

Universities and colleges in Laguna (province)
Business schools in the Philippines
Education in San Pedro, Laguna